Daniel Leiner (May 13, 1961 – October 18, 2018) was an American film and former television director. He was best known for directing the stoner comedy films Dude, Where's My Car? and Harold & Kumar Go to White Castle.

He was born in Manhattan, New York, in 1961. Leiner also directed a wide range of television shows, including Arrested Development, Everwood, Gilmore Girls, Freaks and Geeks, Sports Night, Felicity, Action, The Tick, Austin Stories, The Mind of the Married Man, The Sopranos, and How to Make It in America. He also directed The Office episode "WUPHF.com".

Leiner died from lung cancer on October 18, 2018, at the age of 57.

References

External links

1961 births
2018 deaths
People from Manhattan
Film directors from New York City
American television directors
Comedy film directors
Deaths from lung cancer in California
State University of New York at Purchase alumni